Allie Bones (née Gorelick) is an American politician and social worker. She is the chief of staff of Arizona governor Katie Hobbs since January 2, 2023. Bones was previously the Arizona assistant secretary of state from January 2019 to January 2023. She was the chief executive officer of the Arizona Coalition to End Sexual and Domestic Violence for 11 years.

Life 
Bones was born Allie Gorelick. She is Jewish. Bones completed a bachelor's degree in family studies from the University of Arizona. She earned a master of social worker in May 2001 from the Arizona State University. During Bones' second year graduate school, she interned for the Arizona Coalition Against Domestic Violence. In 2001, she worked as the coalition's lobbyist, during which she met Katie Hobbs who was the director of government relations for the Sojourner Center. She later served as the chief executive officer of the Arizona Coalition to End Sexual and Domestic Violence for 11 years.

Bones joined governor Janet Napolitano's office for children, youth and families, division for women as a senior program analyst for violence against women. She later joined the Arizona department of economic security as the state homeless coordinator and program manager for domestic violence, homeless, and hunger programs.

In January 2019, Bones was selected by Arizona secretary of state Katie Hobbs as the assistant secretary of state. She held the position through January 2, 2023. In the role, she was vice chair of the Arizona Complete Count Committee regarding the 2020 census. In November 2022, Bones was named as Hobbs' incoming chief of staff.

References

21st-century American women politicians
Women in Arizona politics
American social workers
Jewish women politicians
Jewish American people in Arizona politics
21st-century American Jews
University of Arizona alumni
Arizona State University alumni
Chiefs of staff to United States state governors
Year of birth missing (living people)
Living people